Sagarmatha Sambaad is a multi-stakeholder, permanent global dialogue forum initiated by the Government of Nepal. It is scheduled to be held biennially in Nepal.

The Sambaad (dialogue) is named after the world's tallest mountain Sagarmatha (Mount Everest) which is also a symbol of friendship and is meant to promote the notions of common good and collective well-being of humanity. Sagarmatha, being the highest natural landmark on the earth, is also the tallest witness of the unfolding global events.

The first episode of the Sambaad was scheduled from 2 to 4 April 2020. by the Ministry of Foreign Affairs (Nepal), in collaboration with the Institute of Foreign Affairs (IFA), Nepal and Policy Research Institute, a  government policy think tank. The theme of the first Sambaad is "Climate Change, Mountains and the Future of Humanity."

Sambaad 2020

The first-ever Sambaad was to be held in Kathmandu, Nepal on 2–4 April 2020 but given the pandemic the future date will be fixed by coordination diplomatic missionaries. The dialogue is on the topic of "Climate Change, Mountains, and the Future of Humanity" focusing mainly on the impacts of climate change that Nepal and a number other countries around the world are facing.  Deliberations on this theme is expected to contribute to identifying effective responses to combat climate change, by contributing to the sustainable development and complementing existing multilateral processes.

Discussions will also dwell upon the ‘organic link’ between mountains, oceans and many other ecosystems.  Largely, the dialogue will be an opportunity to devise on the actions needed to realize the Sustainable Development Goals and commitment made under the Paris Agreement to limit the global temperature increase to 1.5 °C to avoid the worst impacts of climate change.

Participants 
Invitations for the first Sagarmatha Sambaad are being sent out to around 250 invitees from over 70 countries, representing a cross-section of stakeholders including heads of state, ministers, senior government officials; heads of UN agencies; noted climate scientists, experts, scholars, and researchers; entrepreneurs; influential media persons, celebrities, and activists; emerging youth, women, and community leaders; and heads of INGOs and civil society organizations.

Keynote speakers and other speakers will address the inaugural and closing sessions according to their respective protocol categories in alphabetical order. Moderators and panelists for thematic sessions will speak in the open format, without protocol precedence.

Participation is by invitation only. Invited participants are requested to confirm their participation and register by writing an email to  Sagarmatha Sambad Secretariat.

Venues for 2020 
The inaugural session will be held at Hotel Soaltee Crowne Plaza in Kathmandu on 2 April. The thematic plenary and parallel sessions and the closing session will be held at Chandragiri Hills Resort, Thankot, Kathmandu, on 3 and 4 April.

Hotel Soaltee Crowne Plaza

Tahachal Marg, Kalimati, Kathmandu

News 
Ambassador Invites UNWTO general in Sagarmatha Sambad

Muscat Regarding Sagarmatha Samba

References

2019 establishments in Nepal
International conferences